Carpinteria station is a passenger rail station in the city of Carpinteria, California, in Santa Barbara County. Opened on June 22, 1997, it is served by Amtrak's Pacific Surfliner from San Luis Obispo to San Diego. Ten Pacific Surfliner trains serve the station daily. The station consists only of a concrete platform and an open-air shelter.

Of the 73 California stations served by Amtrak, Carpinteria was the 48th-busiest in FY2010, boarding or detraining an average of approximately 55 passengers daily.

References

External links 

 Carpinteria Amtrak Station (USA Rail Guide -- Train Web)

Amtrak stations in Santa Barbara County, California
Carpinteria, California
Railway stations in the United States opened in 1997
1997 establishments in California